Aelita is the fifth studio album by German electronic and jazz band Tied & Tickled Trio. It was released on 1 June 2007 by Morr Music.

Composition
Aelita "completed a movement that led away from [Tied & Tickled Trio's] earlier jazz-based sound and towards a more self-consciously futurist form of open-ended electronic improvisation," according to The Wire.

Critical reception

Pitchforks Brian Howe wrote that Aelita "is perfect for art gallery openings, dinner parties, and scoring silent sci-fi films. But beyond its utility as a backdrop, it's an awfully cold, blank, and directionless void to trawl alone." Tiny Mix Tapes writer Urban Guerilla noted that the album "fluctuates too much from moment to moment" and generally "falls a little flat." Joe Tacopino of PopMatters described it as "a concept album without any lyrics" and found that "within [the jazz] genre, which has not fully embraced the era of Pro Tools, The Tied and Tickled Trio has constructed a compelling argument to meld these two worlds together." SLUG Magazines Andrew Glassett praised the album's overall production and percussion sounds.

Track listing
All tracks are written by Markus Acher, Micha Acher, Christoph Brandner, Andreas Gerth and Carl Oesterhelt.

 "Aelita 1" – 3:05
 "You Said Tomorrow Yesterday" – 8:22
 "Tamaghis" – 7:33
 "Aelita 2" – 1:32
 "A Rocket Debris Cloud Drifts" – 7:48
 "Chlebnikov" – 4:15
 "Other Voices Other Rooms" – 8:19
 "Aelita 3" – 3:04

Personnel
Credits are adapted from the album's liner notes.

Tied & Tickled Trio
 Markus Acher
 Micha Acher
 Christoph Brandner
 Andreas Gerth
 Carl Oesterhelt

Production
 Steve Rooke – mastering
 Martin Schulze – recording
 Oliver Zülch – mixing

Design
 Andreas Gerth – artwork
 Daidō Moriyama – photography
 Christopher Wool – photography

References

External links
 

2007 albums
Tied & Tickled Trio albums
Morr Music albums